CHOC may mean:

 CHOC (magazine), a Pan-Arabian women's magazine
 The Cambridge History of China
 Canadian House of Commons, a common name for the House of Commons of Canada
 Children's Hospital of Orange County, California, USA
 Chocolate agar
 CHOC-FM, a radio station in Saint-Raymond, Quebec, Canada
 CHOC-FM (Saint-Rémi, Quebec), a former community radio station in Saint-Rémi, Quebec, Canada

See also
Choc (disambiguation)